DJA FM 96.9 is a Chadian radio station. Established in 1998, this was the first privately owned radio station in Ndjamena, Chad. Its president is Zara Yacoub. DJA is a non-specialised radio with an orientation towards the young people and women. The programming consists of news, magazines and interactive transmissions, in French and local Arabic over 60 hours a week.

See also
 Media of Chad
List of radio stations in Africa

References
"Country's oldest privately owned radio station suspended, faces possible closure". Reporters sans frontières. Accessed on 4 October 2007.
Africentr@lemedias Newsletter, Number 31, February 2005]. Institute Panos Paris. Accessed on 4 October 2007.
2005 World Press Freedom Review (Chad). International Press Institute. Accessed on 4 October 2007.

External links
 OneWorld Radiofrancais company information 
 Radio Stations in Ndjamena, Chad. US Embassy website. 

N'Djamena
Radio stations in Chad
Radio stations established in 1998